Ciro De Franco (born 8 October 1988) is an Italian footballer who plays as a defender for  team Fidelis Andria.

Monopoli
On 31 May 2018 after 5 years spent Matera, it was announced that he signed a contract with Monopoli.

On 14 August 2020 he joined Cavese on a 2-year contract. Following Cavese's relegation to Serie D at the end of the 2020–21 season, on 6 August 2021 he moved to Picerno.

On 17 January 2023, De Franco signed with Fidelis Andria.

References

External links
Career statistics 

1988 births
Footballers from Naples
Living people
Italian footballers
Association football defenders
U.S. Catanzaro 1929 players
A.S.G. Nocerina players
Matera Calcio players
S.S. Monopoli 1966 players
Cavese 1919 players
AZ Picerno players
S.S. Fidelis Andria 1928 players
Serie C players
Universiade silver medalists for Italy
Universiade medalists in football
Medalists at the 2009 Summer Universiade